Paul Darwin Foote (March 27, 1888 – August 2, 1971) was a director of research and executive vice president of the Gulf Research and Development company, as well as the United States Assistant Secretary of Defense for Research and Engineering during the Eisenhower administration. He also served as a member of the industrial advisory group of the Atomic Energy Commission.

Education 
Foote graduated in 1909 from Adelbert College, now Case Western Reserve University, with degrees in mathematics and physics. He received an MS degree from the University of Nebraska (now University of Nebraska–Lincoln) in 1912. Foote received a PhD in physics in 1918 from the University of Minnesota.

Notable works 
Statistics on number of libraries is according to
 The origin of spectra: held in 277 libraries worldwide
 Pyrometric practice: held in 59 libraries worldwide
 A new microphotometer for photographic densities by William Frederick Meggers: held in 17 libraries worldwide

References

Further reading 
Paul Darwin Foote: March 27, 1888 – August 2, 1971

External links

National Academy of Sciences Biographical Memoir

1888 births
1971 deaths
Case Western Reserve University alumni
United States Department of Defense officials
University of Minnesota College of Science and Engineering alumni
University of Nebraska–Lincoln alumni
Members of the United States National Academy of Sciences
20th-century American inventors
Presidents of the American Physical Society